Hasanabad (also Romanized as Ḩasanābād) is a village in Meshgin-e Sharqi Rural District, in the Central District of Meshgin Shahr County, Ardabil Province, Iran. At the 2006 census, its population was 267, in 64 families.

References 

Towns and villages in Meshgin Shahr County